Curtea is a commune in Timiș County, Romania. It is composed of three villages: Coșava, Curtea (commune seat) and Homojdia.

Geography 
Curtea is located in the northeast of Timiș County, close to the border of Hunedoara County, 110 km from Timișoara, 45 km from Lugoj and 12 km from Făget, the nearest town. Curtea lies at the foothills of Poiana Ruscă Mountains, at the confluence of Valea Izvorașului with Valea Stâlpului, which, in fact, form the upper course of Bega River.

History 
The first recorded mention of Curtea dates from 1597 (Kurthe), when it belonged to Marzsina District, Hunyad County. Legend has it that Curtea was once the summer residence of Romanian duke Glad, and Curtea took this name because Glad kept his entire court here (in Romanian curte means "court"). A Turkish possession by 1658, Curtea was a place of refuge for Transylvanian nemes (small and medium nobles) in conflict with the Hungarian royal house. In Marsigli's notes from 1690–1700 it was called Kortya and belonged to Facset District, and in the 1717 census it appears as inhabited, with 50 houses. The first Romanian school was established here in 1776. The wooden church, which can still be seen today, dates from 1794.

Demographics 

Curtea had a population of 1,193 inhabitants at the 2011 census, down 10% from the 2002 census. Most inhabitants are Romanians (94.05%), with a minority of Roma (2.1%). For 2.68% of the population, ethnicity is unknown. By religion, most inhabitants are Orthodox (80.64%), but there are also minorities of Pentecostals (12.07%), Baptists (2.1%) and Adventists (1.59%). For 2.68% of the population, religious affiliation is unknown.

References 

Communes in Timiș County
Localities in Romanian Banat